Ioannis Malokinis (1880 in Piraeus – 1942) was a Greek swimmer.  He competed at the 1896 Summer Olympics in Athens. His home island was Spetses. Malokinis competed in the 100 metres freestyle for sailors event.  He placed first of three swimmers, with a time of 2:20.4.  This time was nearly a minute slower than the mark of 1:22.2 set by Alfréd Hajós in the open 100 metres event.

References

External links

1880 births
1942 deaths
Greek male swimmers
Olympic gold medalists for Greece
Olympic swimmers of Greece
Swimmers at the 1896 Summer Olympics
19th-century sportsmen
People from Spetses
Medalists at the 1896 Summer Olympics
Olympic gold medalists in swimming
Greek male freestyle swimmers
Sportspeople from Attica
Date of birth missing
Date of death missing
Place of birth missing
Place of death missing